The Angolan African dormouse (Graphiurus angolensis) is a species of rodent in the family Gliridae. Its natural habitat is tropical dry forests. Although the population size is unknown, it is thought to be generally uncommon.

Description
The fur on the back is soft, smooth and rather long. The dorsal colour varies, ranging from golden brown, rusty brown or drab brown to dark brown, the ridge of the back often being darker than the rest. The underparts are white or cream, slightly tinted with grey, and there is a sharp line demarcating the junction between the dorsal and ventral colouring. The ears are large, brown and rounded and the eyes are large. There is a conspicuous mask round the eyes and the cheeks are white or cream, this colour extending in a band to the shoulders. The tail has short fur near the base and long hair near the tip. It is basically the same colour as the dorsal fur but some white hairs are mixed with the darker ones and the tip is white. This species is similar in appearance and skull characteristics to the rock dormouse (Graphiurus platyops) but their distributions do not overlap. The stone dormouse (Graphiurus rupicola) is larger and not found in miombo woodland, and the small-eared dormouse (Graphiurus microtis) is smaller and the ranges of the two species only overlap in Zambia.

Distribution and habitat
It has only been recorded from seven locations and is likely an uncommon species, its typical habitat being tropical dry woodland, and wooded savannah. In miombo woodland it tends to occur in the vicinity of water.

Ecology
The Angolan African dormouse has been little studied but it is thought to be mainly nocturnal and arboreal. Most of the individuals encountered have been in trees, but specimens have been found in the roof of a hut, in various buildings and in an old beehive. The diet is likely to be omnivorous and to include insect grubs and fruit. Females have sometimes been caught accompanied by up to four young.

Status
G. angolensis has been assessed as "data deficient" by the International Union for Conservation of Nature because of its dubious taxonomic status, the lack of knowledge as to the extent of its occurrence and its conservation status, and the lack of information on its life cycle and the threats it faces.

References

Graphiurus
Mammals of Angola
Endemic fauna of Angola
Mammals described in 1897
Taxa named by William Edward de Winton
Taxonomy articles created by Polbot